Petar Milin (born 29 June 1979) is a Croatian rower. He competed in the men's coxless four event at the 2004 Summer Olympics.

References

1979 births
Living people
Croatian male rowers
Olympic rowers of Croatia
Rowers at the 2004 Summer Olympics
Sportspeople from Zadar